Castor Paul Msemwa (13 February 1955 – 19 October 2017) was a Roman Catholic bishop.

Ordained to the priesthood in 1987, Msemwa served as coadjutor bishop of the Roman Catholic Diocese of Tunduru–Masasi, Tanzania, from 2004 to 2005. He then served as bishop of the diocese from 2005 until his death.

See also
Catholic Church in Tanzania

Notes

External links

1955 births
2017 deaths
21st-century Roman Catholic bishops in Tanzania
Roman Catholic bishops of Tunduru–Masasi
Tanzanian Roman Catholic bishops
Deaths in Oman
Bishops appointed by Pope John Paul II